Shayne Michael is a Wolastoqiyik (Maliseet) poet from Canada. He is most noted for his 2020 poetry collection Fif et sauvage, which was the winner in the French poetry category at the 2021 Indigenous Voices Awards.

A member of the Madawaska Maliseet First Nation in New Brunswick, Michael studied dance and theatre direction at the Université Laval. The title of Fif et sauvage reclaims the pejorative slurs "sauvage", referring to his indigenous status, and "fif", referring to his queer sexuality.

References

21st-century Canadian poets
21st-century Canadian male writers
21st-century First Nations writers
Canadian male poets
Canadian poets in French
First Nations poets
LGBT First Nations people
Canadian LGBT poets
Maliseet people
Université Laval alumni
Writers from New Brunswick
Living people
Year of birth missing (living people)
21st-century Canadian LGBT people